The voiced bilabial fricative is a type of consonantal sound, used in some spoken languages.

That sound may also be transcribed as an advanced labiodental approximant , in which case the diacritic is again frequently omitted, since no contrast is likely. It has been proposed that either a turned ⟨⟩ or reversed ⟨⟩ be used as a dedicated symbol for the bilabial approximant, but despite occasional usage this has not gained general acceptance. 

It is extremely rare for a language to make a phonemic contrast between the voiced bilabial fricative and the bilabial approximant. The Mapos Buang language of New Guinea contains this contrast. Its bilabial approximant is analyzed as filling a phonological gap in the labiovelar series of the consonant system rather than the bilabial series. Proto-Germanic and Proto-Italic are also reconstructed as having had this contrast, albeit with  being an allophone for another consonant in both cases.

The sound is not the primary realization of any sound in English dialects except for Chicano English, but it can be produced by approximating the normal English  between the lips; it can also sometimes occur as an allophone of  after bilabial consonants.

Features
Features of the voiced bilabial fricative:

Occurrence

Voiced bilabial fricative

Bilabial approximant

See also
 Index of phonetics articles

Notes

References

External links
 

Fricative consonants
Bilabial consonants
Approximant consonants
Pulmonic consonants
Voiced oral consonants